Ron Wigg (18 May 1949 – 3 July 1997) was an English professional football striker who spent most of his career in England before ending it in the American Soccer League. He then coached for seventeen years in the United States at both the youth and professional levels.

Player
In 1979, Wigg moved to the United States where he signed with the Columbus Magic of the American Soccer League. That season, he scored thirteen goals in twenty-seven matches as the Magic fell to the Sacramento Gold in the championship game. That fall, he signed with the Cleveland Force of the Major Indoor Soccer League. He played only ten games, but still scored five goals. He finished his career in 1980 with the Magic.

Coach
Following his retirement, he remained in Ohio where he held a variety of coaching positions. In 1983, he coached Saint Charles Preparatory School to the Ohio State AA soccer championship. He also coached the Columbus Capitals in the American Indoor Soccer Association. At the time of his death, he was the Ohio South Youth Soccer Association Director of Coaching and Soccer Education.

References

External links
Ron Wigg Death Notice

Photo of Ron Wigg with Columbus Magic
MISL stats

1949 births
1997 deaths
American Indoor Soccer Association coaches
American Soccer League (1933–1983) players
Barnsley F.C. players
Columbus Magic players
Cleveland Force (original MISL) players
English footballers
English expatriate footballers
Grimsby Town F.C. players
Ipswich Town F.C. players
Major Indoor Soccer League (1978–1992) players
Rotherham United F.C. players
Scunthorpe United F.C. players
Watford F.C. players
People from Great Dunmow
Association football forwards
English expatriate sportspeople in the United States
Expatriate soccer players in the United States
English football managers